Several significant battles are recorded to have taken place in what is now known as Rajasthan.

Against the Arabs

 Umayyad campaigns in India (711–740 CE) – An alliance of rulers under Gurjara Pratihar King Nagabhata I defeated the Arabs in 711 CE in alliance with Kingdom of Mewar Rajput king Bappa Rawal, and forced them to retreat to Sindh.

Against the Ghurids
 Battle of Kasahrada (1178) – Mularaja II of Chaulukya dynasty defeated Muhammad of Ghor.
 Siege of Bayana (1196) – Muhammad of Ghor besieged Bayana, then capital of the Jadaun Rajputs, whose ruler Kumarpala was defeated and the territory passed under Muhammad of Ghor who placed it under his senior slave Bahauddin Turghill.

Against the Sultanates of Delhi, Gujarat and Malwa
 Siege of Ranthambore (1226) – Iltutmish captured the Ranthambore fort in 1226 CE. 
 Siege of Ranthambore (1236) – Vagbhata Chauhan recaptured Ranthambore during the reign of the Delhi ruler Razia. 
 Siege of Ranthambore (1248) – Vagabhata Chauhan successfully defended the fort against Nasiruddin Mahmud.
 Siege of Ranthambore (1253) – Vagbhata Chauhan repelled another invasion from the Mamluks. 
 Siege of Ranthambore (1259) – Nasiruddin Mahmud captured Ranthambore from Jetra Singh Chauchan.
 Siege of Ranthambore (1283) – Shakti Dev Chauhan recaptured Ranthambore from the Mamluks.
Battle of Ranthambore (1290) – Jalaluddin Firuz Khalji attacked Hammir Dev because of his rising power. Jalaludin's forces were defeated by Hammir.
 Siege of Jaisalmer (1294–1295) – Alauddin Khalji commanded the Khilji army under Jalaluddin Firuz Khalji and plundered Jaisalmer after a siege that lasted for a year. For some years afterwards Jaisalmer remained abandoned before the surviving Rajputs reoccupied it.
 Siege of Ranthambore (1301) – Hammiradeva defeated Alauddin Khalji's generals Ulugh Khan and Nusrat Khan; later, Alauddin defeated Hamira dev.
 Siege of Chittor (1303) – Alauddin Khalji defeated Rawal Ratan Singh.
 Siege of Siwana (1308) – Malik Kamaluddin a general of Alauddin Khalji defeated Sheetal Deo.
 Battle of Jalore (1310–11) – Alauddin Khalji defeated Kanhad Dev after a long and bloody war it was a pyrrhic victory.
 Battle of Chittor (1321) – Rana Hammir Singh defeated Maldev Songara, a vassal of the Tughlaq dynasty and recovered Mewar.
 Battle of Singoli (1336) – Rana Hammir Singh defeated and imprisoned Muhammad bin Tughluq and annexed Ajmer, Ranthambhore Fort, Nagaur and Shivapuri.
Battle of Mallani ( 1374 ) - Rawal Mallinath Rathore with the help of Firoz Shah Tughlaq Defeated Tribhuvanshi
 Battle of Mallani (1378) – Rawal Mallinath Rathore defeated thirteen division of Mohamadan army of Nijjamudin of Malwa and Firoz Shah Tughlaq.
 Battle of Mandore (1394) – Rawal Mallinath Rathore sent a contingent under his nephew Rao Chunda to annex Mandore. Rao Chunda defeated Muslim force and annexed Mandore.
 Battle of Mandore (1396) – Rao Chunda Rathore successfully defended Mandore against a Tughlaq army and captured Sambhar, Didwana, Khatu and Ajmer from them.
 Battle of Nagaur (1399) – Rao Chunda Rathore defeated Jalal Khan Khokhar of Nagaur and annexed Nagaur
Battle of Mallani (1399) – Kunwar Jagmal Singh Mahecha Rawal of Malani defeated Hathi Khan general of Gujarat Sultan Mahmud Begada and married Muslim princces Gindoli.
 Battle of Mandore (1421) – Rao Chunda Re-captured Nagaur from Firozkhan.
Battle of Sirohi (1434) – Rao Ranmal defeated Rao Sahasmal Deora and captured Basantgarh, Bhula and areas of Abu.
Siege of Mandalgarh (1435-6) – Rao Ranmal Rathore captured Mandalgarh fort from Rao Bairisal Hada.
Battle of Sarangpur (1437) – Rao Ranmal Rathore defeated and imprisoned Mahmud Khalji.
 Battle of Mandalgarh and Banas (1442-1446) – A series of battles that took place between Mahmud Khalji of Malwa and Rana Kumbha of Mewar. Bloodied by these engagements the Sultan did not attack Mewar for another ten years.
Siege of Gagron (1444) – Sultan Mahmud besieged Gagron fort which belonged to Palhan Singh Khichi. Rana Kumbha had sent reinforcements under his commander Dahir, but Dahir died in battle and Palhan was killed by bhils while fleeing from the fort.
Siege of Mandore (1454) – Rao Jodha Rathore recaptured Mandore from Rana Kumbha.
Battle of Abu (1455) – Qutbuddin sent Imadul Mulk to invade Mewar through Abu, but Imadul suffered heavy losses against the Mewari soldiers posted on the hills and was immediately called back.
 Battle of Nagaur (1456) – Rana Kumbha defeated the combined armies of Shams Khan (sultan of Nagaur) and Qutbuddin (Sultan of Gujarat) and captured Nagaur, Kasili, Khandela and shakambhari.
Battle of Mandalgarh (1456) – Sultan Mahmud attacked Mandalgarh, he sent seven detachments to attack the Rana Kumbha from multiple directions. The Malwa forces under Taj Khan and Ali Khan suffered heavy losses in battle against Rana Kumbha after which Mahmud retreated the next morning.
Siege of Mandalgarh (1456-57) – In December Rana Kumbha was forced to move north to confront the sultan of Gujarat, Sultan Mahmud once again attacked Mandalgarh and captured it after a siege.
Siege of Kumbhalgarh (1458-9) – Sultan Mahmud besieged Kumbalgarh fort but finding the fort too strong he retreated back to Mandu.
Siege of Nagaur (1466) – Rao Jodha defeated Fatankhan of Nagaur. Fatankhan was forced to flee to Jhunjhunu.
Battle of Mandalgarh (1467) – Sultan Mahmud invaded Mewar and fought a battle with Rana Kumbha, but retreated after defeated & taking heavy losses.
Battle of Chappar-Dronpur (1474) – Rao Jodha defeated Bahlol Khan and Hussian Shah of Jaunpur Sultanat.
Siege of Chittorgarh (1475) – After the death of Udai Singh I The sultan of Mandu helped Surajmal and Shahasmal. He started with a large army to assist Surajmal and Shashasmal to the throne of Mewar and arrived near Chittor. Rana Raimal issued from the fortress and attacked Ghiyath Shah who being utterly defeated , fled to Mandu.
 Battle of Sambhar (1486) - Rao Jodha Rathore Defeated invading army of Raja chandrasen of Amber
 Battle of Shiv (1486) - Rao Jodha Rathore Defeated Rawal Devidas of Jaisalmer and re-occupied Shiv
 Battle of Peepar (1492) – Rao Satal Rathore defeated Gudhla Khan, an Afghan general and rescued 140 Maidens that had been captured. Rao Satal himself died that night of the wounds received in the battle.
 Battle of Bikaner (1513) – Muhammad Khan of Nagaur invaded Rathor kingdom of Bikaner but was defeated by Lunkaran Rathore.
 Battle of Jaisalmer ( 1513 ) – Lunkaran Rathore defeated Rawal Jaitsi.
 Battle of Khatoli (1518) – Rana Sanga defeated Ibrahim Lodhi.
 Battle of Dholpur (1519) – Rana Sanga defeated Ibrahim Lodhi second time.
 Battle of Gagron (1519) – Rana Sanga defeated Mahmud Khalji of Malwa.
 Rana Sanga conquest of Gujarat (1520) - In 1520 Rana Sanga led a coalition of Rajput armies to invade Gujarat. He reinstated Raimal as the Rao of Idar and defeated the Gujarat Sultanate forces under the command of Nizam Khan. Rana Sanga drove the army of Muzaffar II deep into Gujarat and chased them up to Ahmedabad. The Sultan of Gujarat was forced to flee to Muhammadabad.
 Siege of Mandsaur (1520) – Sultan Muzaffar Shah II sent an army under Malik Ayaz but failed and retreated to Gujarat.
 Battle of Sevaki (1529) – Rao Ganga and Rao Jaitsi defeated Shekha and Daulat Khan of Nagaur.
Battle of Hirabadi (1533) – Rao Maldeo defeated Daulat Khan of Nagaur. Daulat Khan was forced to flee to AAjmer
 Siege of Jaisalmer (1537) – Rao Maldeo besieged Jaisalmer. Rawal Lunkaran sued for peace.

Against Sur Empire
Battle of Bhadrajun (1533) – Rao Maldeo Rathore defeated Veera.
Siege of Siwana ( 1538 ) – Rao Maldeo sent 500 soldiers to annex Siwana Fort from Dungarsi Rathore for helping Bhatis of Jaisalmer in "Siege of Jaisalmer". Rao Maldeo defeated Rao Dungarsi Rathore and annexed Siwana.
Battle of Raipur (1538) – Rao Maldeo Rathore defeated Veera second time.
 Battle of Jalore (1538) – Rao Maldeo sent Bida Rathore to annex Jalore. Maldeo's force in command of Bida Rathore defeated Sikandar Khan and imprisoned him and annexed Jalore into Marwar kingdom.
 Battle of Pahoba/Sohaba (1542) – Rao Maldeo defeated Rao Jaitsi in battle and captured Bikaner.
 Battle of Sammel (1544) – Costly Afghan victory against Rao Maldeo force led by Rao Jaita and Rao Kumpa Marwar kingdom. Sher Shah Suri exclaimed after a lucky victory that "For a handful of millet, I almost lost the Empire of Hindustan."
 Battle of Jodhpur (1545) – Rao Maldeo Rathore defeated the Afghan garrison in Marwar and reoccupied his lost territories.

Against the Mughal Empires
 Battle of Bayana (1527) – Mughal advance guard was defeated by Rana Sanga. 
 Battle of Khanwa (1527) – Rana Sanga led the Rajput armies against Babur of Ferghana.
 Siege of Bikaner (1534) – Rao Jaitsi Rathore defeated Mughal force under Kamran brother of emperor Humayun. 
 Battle of Harmada (1557) – Rao Maldeo Rathore defeated Udai Singh II and captured Merta.
 Battle of Ajmer (1559) – Akbar's general Qasim Khan annexed Ajmer from Maldeo Rathore.
 Battle of Merta (1562) – Akbar with the help of ruler of Bikaner and Amer defeated Rao Chandra Sen Rathore and captured Merta.
 Battle of Lohawat (1562) – Rao Chandra Sen defeated Udai Singh.
 Battle of Nadol (1563) – Rao Chandra Sen defeated Ramchandra Rathore. Ramchandra fled to Nagaur.
 First Mughal Invasion of Marwar (1562-1583) – Akbar invaded Marwar and occupied Jodhpur. The ruler Rao Chandra Sen continued his struggle until his death in 1581 after which Marwar submitted to Mughal rule in 1583.
 Battle of Mandalgarh (1567) – Akbar advanced by Dholpur route taking the forts of Sivapura and Kota, he dispatched a Mughal army under Asaf khan to take surrounding forts. Mandalgarh was the first to be attacked but Asaf khan was repulsed by the faithful commander Ballu Sinhji, a Solanki Rajput. Later Asaf khan and Wazir khan conquered Mandalgarh by defeating the Solanki contingent of the fort.
 Siege of Chittorgarh (1567) – Akbar defeated Rao Jaimal and Patta Sisodia (Udai Singh II escaped with his family to Aravali hills)
 Siege of Ranthambore (1568) – A successful siege by Akbar causes the Rajput leader Rao Surjan Hada to surrender Ranthambore Fort.
 Siege of Siwana (1572) – Mughal force under General Udai Singh Rathore defeated Kalyanmal Singh Rathore and Kalyandas Rathore and annexed powerful fort of Siwana which served as Rao Chandra Sen's capital was captured by the Mughals after a siege of 8 months.
 Battle of Haldighati (1576) – Battle between Man Singh I and Pratap Singh I.
 Battle of Dewair (1582) – Maharana Pratap fought against Mughal governor of Dewair Sultan Khan and defeated him and 36 Mughal posts were dissolved.
 Battle of Dattani (1583) – Rao Surtan Deora Chauhan of Sirohi defeated Mughal force.
 Battle of Dewair (1606) – Fought in a valley 40 km from Kumbalgarh. Rana Amar Singh defeated, the Mughal prince Muhammad Parviz fled from the battlefield with his commander Asaf Khan III.
 Rajput War (1679–1707) also known as Rathore Rebellion – Aurangzeb took Marwar under his direct control after the death of Maharaja Jaswant Singh. The Rathore army under Veer Durgadas Rathore carried out a relentless struggle against the occupying forces. In 1707 after the death of Aurangzeb, Veer Durgadas defeated the local Mughal force and reoccupied Jodhpur and their lost territories.
 Battle of Khetasar (1680) – Veer Durgadas Rathore defeated Rao Indar Singh.
 Battle of Udaipur (1680) – Aurangzeb attacked Mewar and plundered Udaipur, the citizens were safely escorted to Panarwa a hilly region by Rana Raj Singh but 63 temples in and around Udaipur were plundered and many villages were burned down by Aurangzeb's general Taj Khan. The Mughal army was eventually starved because of the scorched earth techniques and guerrilla warfare used by the Rana. Aurangzeb after a failed campaign left Mewar to his son Akbar and retreated to Ajmer.
 Battle of Aravalli hills (1680) – In the second half of 1680, after several months of such setbacks, Aurangzeb decided on an all-out offensive. Niccolao Manucci, an Italian gunner in the Mughal army, says: "for this campaign, Aurangzeb put in pledge the whole of his kingdom." Three separate armies, under Aurangzeb's sons Akbar, Azam and Muazzam, penetrated the Aravalli hills from different directions. However, their artillery lost its effectiveness while being dragged around the rugged hills and the Prince Akbar rebelled against Aurangzeb . Aurangzeb later complied to the demands of Rana Raj Singh and Mewar was left alone.
Battle of Khanana (1681-1687) –  Rathore rebels under Veer Durgadas Rathore defeated Mughal force. This battle resulted in major victory for Rathores. Kumpawats captured Siwana town from Mughals. Mughal commander Purdil Khan was killed in this battle.
Battle of Ajmer (1690) – Veer Durgadas Rathore defeated Safi Khan.
 Battle of Jodhpur (1707) – Veer Durgadas Rathore took advantage of the disturbances following the death of Aurangzeb in 1707 to seize Jodhpur and eventually evict the occupying Mughal force out of Marwar.
 Annexation of Amer (1708) –  Bahadur Shah I marched with a large army and annexed Amer without a war. Raja Sawai Jai Singh was forced to retreat with his army. Amber was named 'Mominabad' by the Mughal emperor.
 Battle of Merta (1708) – Bahadur Shah I's general Mihrab Khan defeated Ajit Singh of Marwar. The Mughal emperor was advised to stay in Ajmer as the Mughals were wary of the guerrilla tactics of Veer Durgadas. Ajit Singh however went against the advice of Durgadas Rathore and directly confronted the large Mughal army. The Mughals bombarded the Rathor horsemen with cannons and rockets and forced them to retreat after heavy losses. Jodhpur was once again occupied by the Mughals. 
 Rajput Rebellion 1708-1710 – The three Rajput Raja's of Amber, Udaipur and Jodhpur made a joint resistance to the Mughals. The Rajputs first expelled the commandants of Jodhpur and Bayana and recovered Amer by a night attack. They next killed Sayyid Hussain Khan Barha in the "Battle of Sambhar (1709)". Ajit Singh also attacked Ajmer and forced its governor to pay tribute. Sayyid Hidayatullah, the governor of Ranthambor was also defeated, bringing a danger to the Mughal capital itself. Bahadur Shah I, then in the Deccan was forced to patch up a truce with the Rajput Rajas (1710).
 Siege of Jodhpur and Jaipur (1708) – Jai Singh and Ajit Singh storm Amber and Jodhpur and retake their capitals from the Mughal garrisons. 
 Battle of Sambhar (1708) - Sayyid Hussain Barha of Mewat and Churaman Jat defeated near Sambhar by the Rathore-Kachwaha army. Barha shot dead with his two brothers. 
 Battle of Javli (1710) – Mir Khan of Narnaul with 7000 Mughal troops and Churaman Jat with 6000 Jats effectively checked by Gaj Singh Naruka at Javli. 
 Battle of Tonk (24 March 1710) – Muhammad Khan of Tonk defeated by the Rathore-Kachwaha army.
 Battle of Kama (1708) (October 4–7, 1708)  – Ajit Singh Kachwaha, the zamindar of Kama defeated the combined armies of Mughals and Jats. The Mughal-Jat army numbered 18,000 while the Kachwahas had 10,000 horsemen. After a bitter fight the Mughal faujdar Raza Bahadur was killed and the injured Jat leader Churaman was forced to retreat to Thun.
Battle of Bandanwara (1711) – Maharana Sangram Singh - II defeated Mughal force under Mir Bakshi and Zulfikar Khan.
 Jai Singh II's campaign against the Jats (1718-1722)  – The Jats under Churaman had been actively looting and plundering in the Agra district due to which the Mughals had to close the roads to Delhi and Agra for the safety of the traders. In 1718 Sawai Jai Singh II was appointed by the Mughal emperor to destroy the Jat stronghold of Thun. Jai Singh surrounded the fort and was about to breach it when the Sayyid brothers, who were rivals of the Jaipur raja, made a separate peace with the Jats on behalf of the emperor. Jai Singh was forced to withdraw in disgust. Two years later Churaman died and his son Mokham Singh succeeded him. Mokhams first step as a ruler was to imprison his cousin Badan Singh. Badan asked for help from Sawai Jai Singh II. Jai Singh readily set upon Thun and captured it after a six-month siege. Mokham was forced to flee and Badan Singh was made the Raja of Deeg on the condition that he pays tribute.

Post-Mughal Battles
 Battle of Gangwana (1741) – 1,000 Rathore cavaliers of Bhakt Singh fought a combined army of a 100,000 men consisting of Mughals, Kachwahas, Chauhans, Jadauns, Sisodias and Jats. In this battle Bhakt Singh was defeated but his cavalry charge killed and injured thousands of his foes. Sir Jadunath Sarkar quotes that - "the battle front was like tigers upon a flock of sheep". According to Harcharandas more than 12,000 men were slain in the battlefield.
 Battle of Rajmahal (1747) – Ishvari Singh of Jaipur defeated a coalition of armies led by Jagat Singh of Mewar.
 Battle of Bagru (1748) – Madho Singh I defeated Ishvari Singh.
 Battle of Raona (1750) – The Mughal Empire invaded Marwar but were repelled by the armies of Ram Singh and  Ishvari Singh.
 Battle of Luniawas (1750) – Bhakt Singh challenged his nephew Ram Singh for the throne of Marwar. Ram Singh hired a large contingent of Afghan and Baloch Musketeers from Sindh to defeat his uncle, he further formed a powerful army in Jodhpur and appointed Sher Singh Rathore, a veteran general of Marwar to defeat the usurper. At first Ram Singhs general Sher Singh Rathore pushed Bhakt Singh 4 miles back and almost forced him to retreat, 2000 Rathores of Bhakt Singh fell in the battle with 9 Rathor nobles and Bhakt Singh was severely injured by spear and bullet wounds, but Bhakt Singh made a fierce counterattack which killed Sher Singh and most of Ram Singhs commanders making the battle a costly victory for Bhakt Singh.
Battle of Ajmer (1752) – On May 1752 Jayappaji Rao Scindia and Ram Singh I attacked Ajmer, sacked it and massacred the populace. Upon learning of the invasion, Bhakt Singh marched with his army and camped 8 miles away from Ajmer. He waited till July and then attacked Jayappa. Bhakt Singh blocked the surrounding paths and placed his guns on a hill, he then bombarded the Marathas, upon receiving heavy casualties, the Marathas fled along with the army of Ram Singh.
 Battle of Kumher (1754) – Suraj Mal Jat ruler of Bharatpur defeated the combined armies of Marathas and Mughals.
 Conquest of Alwar (1756) – Suraj Mal defeated Mughal Empire and conquered the Alwar fort and some of the adjacent territory.
 Siege of forts of Barwara and Tonk (1757) – Raghunath Rao and Malhar Rao Holkar laid siege on the forts of Barwara and Tonk. They were defeated by the garrison of these forts under Madho Singh I.
 Battle of Kakor (1759) – The forces of Madho Singh of Jaipur defeated and repulsed the Holkar forces of Malhar Rao Holkar led by the veteran Gangadhar Tantiya in present day Kakor, Uniara, Tonk district, Rajasthan.
Battle of Mangrol (1761) – Madho Singh of Jaipur fought Malhar Rao Holkar. The Jaipur army had 10,000 men while the Holkar army had 6,000 men from Indore and 3,000 men supplied by the Rao of Kota. After a 2-day battle the Jaipur army was completely destroyed. However Malhar Rao was not able to plunder Dhundhar for long as he was recalled to Bundelkhand because of rebellions and threats of invasion by Shuja-Ud-Daula of Awadh.
 Battle of Maonda and Mandholi (1767) – Jaipur forces defeat the forces of Bharatpur.
 Battle of Kama (1768) – Madho Singh I invaded Bharatpur at the head of 16,000 men where he defeated jat leader Jawahar Singh again on 29 February 1768.
 Battle of Mandan (1775) –  The Shekhawatis defeated a Mughal force under Mitrasen Ahir, Peero Khan and Kale Khan. After heavy losses Peero Khan died and Mitra Sen fled.
 Battle of Khatu Shyamji (1779) – Chood Singh Nathawat of Doongri and Dalel Singh Khangarot of Sewa defeated the imperial army under Murtaza Khan Bhadech, Najaf Khan and Abdullah Khan.
 Battle of Tunga or Battle of Lalsot (1787) – Combined forces of Jaipur and Jodhpur defeated Maratha forces led by Mahadji Shinde.
 Battle of Patan (1790) – The Battle of Patan was fought on 20 June 1790 between the Scindias of Gwalior and the Kachwahas of Jaipur, and resulted decisive victory of Maratha forces.
 Battle of Merta (1790) – Maratha army of Mahadaji Shinde under De Boigne defeated the army of Vijay Singh.
 Battle of Fatehpur (1799) – The Battle was fought in March 1799 between the Maratha Kingdom of Gwalior supported by General George Thomas and the Kingdom of Jaipur under Pratap Singh of Jaipur which resulted in a decisive Jaipur victory.
 Battle of Malpura (1800) –  Combined Force of Rathores and Kachhawahas defeated by Marathas under Daulat Rao Sindhia
 Battle of Deeg (1804) – Ranjit Singh of Bharatpur and Yashwantrao Holkar defeated East India Company
 Siege of Deeg (1804) – Jats under Ranjit Singh and Marathas under Yashwantrao Holkar defeated East India Company
 Siege of Bharatpur (1805) – Jats and Marathas defeated East India Company
 Siege of Mehrangarh (1806) – Man Singh of Marwar defeated the armies of Jaipur, Mewar and Bikaner. So comprehensively that Jagat Singh of Jaipur had to pay a sum of Rs. 2,00,000 to secure his safe passage. In honour of Man Singhs victory over Jaipur the Jai Pol, or victory gate was built in the fort in 1808.
 Battle of Bhomgarh (1810) – Jagat Singh defeated Amir Khan nawab of Tonk.
 Siege of Bharatpur (1825–26) – East India Company defeated Bharatpur State
 Battle of Bithoda (8 September 1857) – Kushal Singh Champawat, a noble of Jodhpur joined the Indian Rebellion of 1857 against the British Empire, around 5,000 Rajputs of Pali joined him. The British asked Takht Singh to deal with him, however most of the Rathore nobles refused to fight with a fellow clansmen for foreigners. Kushal Singh thus defeated a force of local levies raised by Takht Singh of Jodhpur.
 Battle of Chelawas (1857-1858) – Kushal Singh killed Captain Mason and Hung his head on his fort gate for insulting him, he then defeated a British army of 2,000 men under Brigadier Lawrence.
 Siege of Auwa (1857-1858) – An army of 30,000 men under Colonel Holmes forced Kushal Singh to retreat to his fort in Auwa. Holmes besieged the Auwa Fort and breached it after 6 months of siege. Kushal Singh was able to escape to Udaipur. Auwa was then confiscated by the British until the death of Kushal Singh in 1864.

See also 
 List of wars involving India
 Afghan–Sikh Wars
 Mughal–Maratha Wars
 Mughal-Rajput Wars
 Ahom–Mughal conflicts
 Chola–Chalukya wars
 Ancient Hindu wars
 List of Anglo-Indian Wars
 Battles involving the Maratha Empire
 List of battles involving the Sikh Empire
 List of battles between Mughals and Sikhs
 Military history of the North-West Frontier
 Rajput resistance to Muslim conquests
 List of early Hindu–Muslim military conflicts in the Indian subcontinent

References 

History of Rajasthan
Battles involving the Rajputs
 
Battles involving the Indian kingdoms